b4-4 is the debut album by Canadian boy band b4-4, released on June 6, 2000. It includes the successful tracks "Get Down", "Go Go", "Everyday",  and "Endlessly". The album debuted at #38 on the Canadian Albums Chart, and was certified Platinum (100,000 copies) in Canada in April 2001.

Track listing
"Really Gotta Want It"
"Ball & Chain"
"That's How I Know"
"Go Go"
"Everyday"
"Smile"
"Get Down"
"Don't Let the Sun Catch You Cryin'"
"How Did We End Up Here"
"You've Got a Friend"
"Savin' for a Rainy Day"
"Endlessly"

Production
 Art Direction, Design – Steve Goode
 Coordinator [Production] – Tanya Nagowski
 Edited By [Digital Editing] – Blair Robb, Darius Szczepaniak, Denis Tougas, R. H. Leavens
 Engineer – Darius Szczepaniak, Darrel Moen, Diesel, Jamie Houston, Lenny De Rose
 Executive-Producer – Michael Roth
 Management – Ray Danniels, Steve Hoffman
 Mastered By – P. Letros
 Mixed By – Joel Soyffer (tracks: 3), Lenny De Rose (tracks: 1, 2, 4 to 12)
 Photography By, Artwork [Digital Imaging] –Dan Couto
 Producer – James McCollum (tracks: 4, 5, 7, 10, 12), Jamie Houston (tracks: 3), Jason Levine* (tracks: 4, 5, 7, 10, 12), Lenny De Rose* (tracks: 2, 6, 10), Mike Roth (tracks: 2, 6, 12), Peter Cardinali (tracks: 1, 8), Stephan Moccio(tracks: 2, 6, 9, 11, 12)

Year-end charts

References

2000 debut albums
B4-4 albums
Arista Records albums